Little Fish is a 2005 Australian film directed by Rowan Woods and written by Jacquelin Perske. It was filmed in and around Sydney, in Cabramatta and in Fairfield.  The film was developed and produced by Vincent Sheehan and Liz Watts of Porchlight Films, with Cate Blanchett and her husband Andrew Upton's production company Dirty Films receiving an Associate Producer credit.

Little Fish was released on 8 September 2005 in Australia. It received positive reviews from critics.

Plot
Little Fish is about Tracy Heart, a former heroin addict who is desperately trying to escape her past and achieve her goals and dreams. Tracy lives with her mother and brother Ray in the suburb of Cabramatta, Sydney, where heroin is readily available.

She is in need of money to become a partner in the video store that she works in, but her loan applications are repeatedly rejected by finance providers, as a result of her past criminal record, poor repayments of credit card debt, history of drug use and lack of collateral. Tracy lies to both her mother and her boss at the video store, pretending she has received the loan. The casual ways people lie to each other for convenience is one of the recurring themes of the movie.

Tracy is trying to help her drug addicted stepfather and former National Rugby League star Lionel Dawson to kick his heroin addiction.
After a four-year absence in Vancouver, her former boyfriend Jonny Nguyen, also a former heroin addict, has come back into her life. Jonny, who now dresses in business suits, claims to have employment as a stockbroker at a large firm and suggests he may be able to obtain the money Tracy desires through share trading. The romance between Tracy and Jonny is rekindled.

Upon visiting Jonny's alleged workplace, Tracy discovers Jonny has lied to her and is not in fact employed as a stockbroker. Jonny has become involved in a drug deal with her brother Ray, and Tracy also chooses to become involved in the deal as she sees this as the only means of providing the finance she needs to become a partner in the video store.

Tracy, Ray, and Jonny set out to execute the deal, which ends in tragedy. Tracy's courage and deep love for those she cares about are notable in the climactic scenes of the film.

Cast
Cate Blanchett as Tracy Louise Heart
Hugo Weaving as Lionel Dawson
Sam Neill as Brad "The Jockey" Thompson
Martin Henderson as Ray Heart
Noni Hazlehurst as Janelle Heart
Dustin Nguyen as Jonny Nguyen
Joel Tobeck as Steven Moss
Lisa McCune as Laura
Susie Porter as Jenny Moss
Anh Do as Tran 
Frannie Cutrupi as the Local Girl

Release

Home media
Little Fish was released on DVD a part of the Dendy Collection by Icon Entertainment. A Blu-ray edition was released in August 2010.

Soundtrack
Cover versions of the Cold Chisel song "Flame Trees" appear more than once during the film and on the soundtrack. One version is sung by The Sacred Heart School Choir from Cabramatta, New South Wales, the other by singer Sarah Blasko. The soundtrack also features original songs composed by Nathan Larson.

At the ARIA Music Awards of 2006 the soundtrack was nominated for ARIA Award for Best Original Soundtrack, Cast or Show Album.

Track listing
"Flame Trees" - Sarah Blasko
"Little Fish Theme"
"A Place in the Sun" - Hoodoo Gurus
"Pool Love"
"Con Mua Ha" - Mylinh Dinh
"Half Speed Love"
"Something's Gotten Hold of My Heart" - Bic Runga
"I Can't Score For You"
"Flame Trees" - The Sacred Heart School, Cabramatta
"Little Fish Theme" (Redux)
"Ban Toi" - The Enterprise Band featuring Hoang Son
"Lionel Requiem"
"End Credits"
"Tinh Xot Xa Thoi".... Hong Anh Singer ( Le Quang)

Reception
Little Fish received positive reviews from critics. The film has a 90% rating on Rotten Tomatoes based on 27 reviews. Metacritic assigned the film a weighted average score of 77 (out of 100), based on 9 critics, indicating "generally favorable reviews". Critics admired the film for its screenplay and the actors' performances. The critic Liz Braun said "Little Fish has beautifully understated performances and a script that emphasizes the mundane and the manipulative in the addict's world." Owen Gleiberman from Entertainment Weekly praised it mostly for its acting performances, saying "The actors are terrific, especially Weaving, who plays bottoming out as a tragedy spiked with gallows humor, and Blanchett, who digs deep into the booby-trapped nature of recovery. The revelation, however, is Rowan Woods, a major filmmaker in the making."

Awards
The film was nominated for 13 Australian Film Institute Awards in 2005, and won five awards including Best Actor (Hugo Weaving), Best Actress (Cate Blanchett), Best Supporting Actress (Noni Hazlehurst), and Best Editing. It also won several Inside Film Awards, including Best Actress (Cate Blanchett) and Best Actor (Hugo Weaving). Jacquelin Perske's screenplay won the Film Script category at the 2005 Queensland Premier's Literary Awards.

See also
Cinema of Australia

References

External links

Little Fish at the National Film and Sound Archive

Australian drama films
2005 drama films
Vietnamese-language films
Films set in Sydney
Films shot in Sydney
Films directed by Rowan Woods
Cabramatta, New South Wales
Films produced by Liz Watts
2000s English-language films